Ian Charles McWalters  (born 1951) is Chairman of the Market Misconduct Tribunal and the Securities and Futures Appeals Tribunal in Hong Kong. He is a retired judge and former prosecutor.

Legal career

McWalters graduated from the University of Sydney with a BA in 1972 and subsequently obtained an LLB in 1975.

He was admitted as solicitor in New South Wales, in 1975 and as barrister and solicitor in Papua New Guinea in the same year. He was admitted as barrister and solicitor in the Australian Capital Territory in 1994 and as barrister in Queensland in 2001.

McWalters was called to the Bar in Hong Kong in 2001. He took silk in 2005.

In 2009, McWalters was appointed Director of Public Prosecutions of Hong Kong.

On 1 July 2010, McWalters was appointed as a justice of the peace.

Judicial career
In 2011, McWalters was appointed a Judge of the Court of First Instance of the High Court of Hong Kong. As he was the DPP in the Department of Justice prior to the appointment, he could not, for six months after joining the Judiciary, deal with any criminal trials or appeals or any civil cases involving the Government.

In 2014, he was appointed Justice of Appeal of the Court of Appeal of the High Court of Hong Kong.

In February 2016, on reaching the retirement age of 65, on the recommendation of the Judicial Officers Recommendation Commission, his term of office was extended for 3 years. In February 2019, his term of office was extended for another 2 years. In February 2021, he retired from the bench.

McWalters sat as a Deputy Judge of the High Court of Hong Kong from April to September 2021.

On 1 July 2021, McWalters was awarded the Gold Bauhinia Star in recognition of his dedicated and distinguished service in the Judiciary during the past ten years.

On 30 July 2021, McWalters was appointed as Chairman of the Market Misconduct Tribunal and the Securities and Futures Appeals Tribunal for a 3-year term from 1 October 2021 to 30 September 2024.

References

1951 births
Living people
University of Sydney alumni
Australian judges on the courts of Hong Kong
Australian emigrants to Hong Kong
Hong Kong judges
Hong Kong Senior Counsel